In military terms, 51st Division or 51st Infantry Division may refer to:

 Infantry divisions
 51st Division (1st Formation)(People's Republic of China), 1949–1952
 51st Reserve Division (German Empire)
 51st Infantry Division Siena (Kingdom of Italy)
 51st Division (Imperial Japanese Army)
 51st Division (Philippines)
 51st Guards Rifle Division
 51st Rifle Division (Soviet Union)
 51st (Highland) Division (United Kingdom)
 51st Infantry Division (United States)